Zagłębie Lubin S.A. is a Polish professional football club based in Lubin. Founded in 1945 as OMTUR Lubin, the club competes in the Ekstraklasa.

History

The football team was founded in 1945 as OMTUR Lubin by local members of the Youth Organization of the Association of Workers’ Universities (Organizacja Młodzieży Towarzystwa Uniwersytetów Robotniczych, OMTUR). The team played matches on a pitch at Kościuszko Street. The games of OMTUR Lubin were very popular, attracting crowds of people. Among the opponents, was the team of the local Red Army garrison, which faced the Poles in autumn 1945.

In March 1946, Klub Sportowy Zawisza, based on OMTUR Lubin, was formed (the name comes after a medieval knight, Zawisza Czarny). Among its players was Emil Czyżowski of Pogoń Lwów, Tadeusz Rela of Tarnovia Tarnów, and Stanisław Leśniewski, who had briefly played for Dynamo Kyiv. In 1946, Zawisza played in the Group IV, winning promotion to the newly formed A-Klasa. On May 5, 1946 Zawisza Lubin played its first ever league game against MKS Zgorzelec. In 1947, Zawisza won the Cup of Lower Silesia, and in the same year, the team from Lubin faced the team of the Northern Group of Forces, headquartered in nearby Legnica. The game, which Poles won 1–0, was attended by Marshal Konstantin Rokossovsky.

In 1949, Zawisza Lubin changed name into Gwardia, and in 1951, to Spojnia. In 1953, the team returned to its original name, Zawisza.

In 1957, rich deposits of copper were discovered in the area of Lubin. With the construction of the Lubin mine, the team gained a rich sponsor (see also KGHM Polska Miedz). In 1961, its name was changed into Górnik ("Miner"). In 1963, Górnik won promotion from the C-Klasa to the B-Klasa. Finally, in 1966, its name was changed to MKS Zagłębie Lubin, with MKS standing for Międzyzakładowy Klub Sportowy (Inter-Enterprise Sports Club). In 1968, Zagłębie won promotion to the third division. In the 1970s Zagłębie had nine departments: football, volleyball, basketball, boxing, handball, track and field, weight lifting, table tennis and contract bridge. In 1974,  became the football team's new manager. Zagłębie was a sensation in the 1975–76 Polish Cup, beating the reigning Polish Champions Ruch Chorzów, however, they eventually lost to Górnik Zabrze.

In 1975, Zagłębie won a promotion to the second division, only to be relegated after one year. In 1978, it again was promoted and relegated after one year. The team was a sensation in the 1978–79 Polish Cup, beating GKS Katowice, Legia Warszawa and Górnik Zabrze, and reaching the semi-final, where it lost 0–3 to Wisła Kraków.

In 1982, under manager Stanisław Świerk, Zagłębie again won promotion to the second division. In 1985, it was finally promoted to the Ekstraklasa. With a new manager, Eugeniusz Rozanski, and a new stadium, Zagłębie was at that time one of the most powerful sports organization in Poland. On 27 July 1985, Zagłębie played its first Ekstraklasa home game, beating 1–0 GKS Katowice, after a goal by Eugeniusz Ptak. In the 1985–86 season, Zagłębie was 12th, in 1986–87, 8th, and in 1987–88, 11th. To avoid relegation, the team from Lubin had to participate in the playoffs, in which it lost to Górnik Wałbrzych (1–2, 2–2).

After one year in the second division, Zagłębie returned to the Ekstraklasa (June 1989). Managed by Stanisław Świerk, it was a Polish runner-up (June 1990), winning a spot in 1990–91 UEFA Cup. In the first round, Zagłębie faced the Italian side Bologna, losing both games 0–1, 0–1.

In June 1991, managed by Marian Putyra, Zagłębie won the Polish championship, earning a spot in the 1991–92 European Cup, where it faced Brøndby. The Polish Champions lost 0–3 in the first leg, and won 2–1 at home, to be eliminated. Among Zagłębie’s top players at that time were Romuald Kujawa and Adam Zejer, both top scorers of the Ekstraklasa in 1990 and 1991.

In 1995 Zagłębie was the 4th team in Poland, winning a spot in the 1995–96 UEFA Cup, to lose to the European powerhouse, AC Milan (with Roberto Baggio, Paolo Maldini, Alessandro Costacurta, Roberto Donadoni, Marcel Desailly, Zvonimir Boban, and manager Fabio Capello).

In June 2003, after 13 years, Zagłębie was relegated from the Ekstraklasa. Before that, Zagłębie played 20 games in the Intertoto Cup, with 7 victories, 5 ties and 8 losses. Furthermore, in 2001, it was the fifth team in Poland, also reaching the semi-final of the Polish Cup.

After one year Zagłębie returned to the Ekstraklasa (June 2004), and in spring 2005, it again reached the final of the Polish Cup, losing 0–2 to Dyskobolia Grodzisk Wielkopolski. In 2005–06, under Franciszek Smuda, Zagłębie, with its top scorer Michał Chałbiński, finished third in the league, winning a spot in European cups. Furthermore, the team again reached the final of the Polish Cup, losing 2–3, 1–3 to Wisła Płock. In the UEFA Cup, Zagłębie was eliminated by Dinamo Minsk (1–1, 0–0).

In the 2006–07 season Zagłębie won the Polish championship for the second time, and at the beginning of the 2007 season it won the Polish Super Cup.

In 2013–14, Zagłębie reached the Polish Cup final for the third time, this time losing 5–6 on penalties following a 0–0 draw after extra time to Zawisza Bydgoszcz. In the 2015–16 season, Zagłębie finished third in the Ekstraklasa, earning a spot in the 2016–17 UEFA Europa League qualifications, in which it managed to defeat Bulgarian team Slavia Sofia and Serbian powerhouse Partizan, before being eliminated by Danish side SønderjyskE.

Achievements
 Ekstraklasa:
 Winner: (2) 1990–91, 2006–07
 2nd: (1) 1989–90
 3rd: (2) 2005–06, 2015–16
 Second Division:
 Winner: (3) 1984–85, 1988–89, 2014–15
 2nd: (2) 2003–2004, 2008–09
 Third Division
 Winner: (2) 1974–75, 1977–78
 Runners-up: (2) 1979–80, 1981–82
 Polish Cup:
 Finalist: (3) 2004–05, 2005–06, 2013–14
 Semi-Finalist: (2) 1978–79, 2000–01
 Polish SuperCup:
 Winner: (1) 2007
 Finalist: (1) 1991
 Polish League Cup:
 Finalist: (1) 2000–01
 Młoda Ekstraklasa:
 Champions: 2010, 2011
 Runners-up: 2012
 Polish U-19 Championship:
 Winners: (2) 2009, 2010
 Runner Up: (1) 1990

Zagłębie in Europe

Current squad

Out on loan

Notable former players

  Krzysztof Piątek
  Piotr Zieliński
  Łukasz Piszczek
  Mariusz Lewandowski
  Dariusz Marciniak
  Bojan Isailović
  Arkadiusz Woźniak
  Adam Matuszczyk
  Maciej Iwański
  Manuel Arboleda
  Zbigniew Szewczyk|
  Vadim Rogovskoy
  Jakub Świerczok
  Adam Zejer
  Jarosław Jach
  Costa Nhamoinesu
  Iliyan Mitsanski
  Mouhamadou Traoré
  Darvydas Šernas
  Ľubomír Guldan
  Róbert Jež
  Samuel Mráz
  Piotr Czachowski
  Dariusz Lewandowski
  Wojciech Łobodziński
  Dariusz Jackiewicz
  Filip Jagiełło

Staff

Managers

 Zdzisław Wolsza (1976)
 Alojzy Łysko (1987–88)
 Stanisław Świerk (1988–90)
 Marian Putyra (25 October 1990 – 30 June 1992)
 Jerzy Fiutowski (1993–94)
 Mirosław Dragan (21 April 1994 – 25 October 1994)
 Wiesław Wojno (26 October 1994 – 10 September 1995)
 Andrzej Strejlau (24 October 1995 – 15 June 1996)
 Mirosław Dragan (15 June 1996 – 28 October 1996)
 Adam Topolski (29 October 1996 – 1 October 1997)
 Andrzej Szarmach (1997–98)
 Mirosław Jabłoński (1 July 1998 – 30 June 2001)
 Stefan Majewski (28 June 2001 – 17 November 2001)
 Jerzy Wyrobek (17 November 2001 – 18 June 2002)
 Adam Nawalka (18 June 2002 – 6 October 2002)
 Wiesław Wojno (7 October 2002 – 5 May 2003)
 Adam Topolski (5 May 2003 – 29 July 2003)
 Žarko Olarević (July 2003 – 3 Dec)
 Dražen Besek (23 December 2003 – 6 September 2005)
 Franciszek Smuda (6 September 2005 – 30 June 2006)
 Marek Kusto (interim) (13 December 2005 – 18 December 2005)
 Edward Klejndinst (1 July 2006 – 3 October 2006)
 Czesław Michniewicz (3 October 2006 – 22 October 2007)
 Rafał Ulatowski (22 October 2007 – 11 July 2008)
 Dariusz Fornalak (11 July 2008 – 17 November 2008)
 Robert Jończyk (17 November 2008 – 12 April 2009)
 Orest Lenczyk (16 April 2009 – 30 June 2009)
 Andrzej Lesiak (17 June 2009 – 27 August 2009)
 Franciszek Smuda (28 August 2009 – 18 December 2009)
 Marek Bajor (18 December 2009 – 7 March 2011)
 Marcin Broniszewski (interim) ( 7–10 March 2011)
 Jan Urban (10 March 2011 – 31 October 2011)
 Pavel Hapal (31 October 2011 – 30 July 2013)
 Adam Buczek (interim) (30 July 2013 – 27 September 2013)
 Orest Lenczyk (27 September 2013 – 12 May 2014)
 Piotr Stokowiec (12 May 2014 – 28 November 2017)
 Mariusz Lewandowski (28 November 2017 – 29 October 2018)
 Ben van Dael (29 October 2018 – 31 August 2019)
 Paweł Karmelita (interim) (31 August 2019 – 16 September 2019)
 Martin Ševela (16 September 2019 – 1 July 2021)
 Paweł Karmelita (interim) (1 July 2021 – 16 July 2021)
 Dariusz Żuraw (16 July 2021 – 16 December 2021)
 Paweł Karmelita (interim) (16 December 2021 – 21 December 2021)
 Piotr Stokowiec (21 December 2021 – 8 November 2022)
 Paweł Karmelita (interim) (8 November 2022 – 29 November 2022)
 Waldemar Fornalik (29 November 2022 – present)

See also
 Football in Poland

References
 History of Zaglebie Lubin, in Polish. Retrieved January 9, 2016

External links

 Official website 
 Unofficial website 
 Zagłębie Lubin at 90minut.pl 

 
Association football clubs established in 1945
1945 establishments in Poland
Mining association football clubs in Poland